Leucophyllum langmaniae is a shrub native of Mexico (Chihuahuan Desert), semi-evergreen, with gray-green leaves of velvety texture. The flowers are lavender. They appear in the fall, and are even more abundant if drought or heat waves were important.

Leucophyllum langmaniae is called Langman's sage or Rio Bravo sage. However, it is not a true sage and it has no systematics relationship to the genus Salvia.

The specific epithet langmaniae was given in honor of Ida Kaplan Langman.

References 

langmaniae
Flora of the Chihuahuan Desert